AZP S-60 (abbrev. АЗП (AZP); literally: Automatic anti-aircraft gun S-60)  is a Soviet towed, road-transportable, short- to medium-range, single-barrel anti-aircraft gun from the 1950s. The gun was extensively used in Warsaw Pact, Middle Eastern and South-East Asian countries.

History
In the late 1940s, the Soviets started to develop a 57 mm anti-aircraft gun, to replace its 37 mm guns. Three models were presented, and the winning design was made by V. G. Grabin. According to western intelligence sources, the German prototype gun 5,5 cm Gerät 58 formed the basis for the design.  The Soviets were also able to study German 5 cm Flak 41 guns that had been captured following the Battle of Stalingrad.

The prototype passed the field tests in 1946 and was accepted into service in 1950, after some minor modifications. The anti-aircraft gun was given the name 57 mm AZP S-60. Grabin continued the development and fielded the SPAAG version ZSU-57-2 in 1955.

The fire direction device was developed from the German Lambda calculator (Kommandogerät 40, 40A, and 40B) and was called PUAZO-5A. It had also a distance measuring device called D-49. The fire direction was also made more effective by including Grom-2 (10 cm wavelength) radars to the AA-batteries. The whole system was called SON-9. Later on, the calculators would be changed into the more modern RPK-1 Vaza, which had been designed by M. M. Kositskin. The calculator and the radars were transported by Ural 375 trucks.

The 57 mm gun replaced the 37 mm divisional guns in Soviet service in the 1950s. A divisional anti-aircraft regiment consisted of two AA-batteries with six 57 mm guns each. The PVO air-defence troops AA-regiments consisted of four 57 mm AA-batteries (24 guns).

In the mid-1960s, the Soviet divisional anti-aircraft units began replacing their AA-guns with missiles, and by the end of the 1970s, the AA-guns had almost disappeared. However, they were used in many other countries. The performance of AAA (anti-aircraft artillery) in Vietnam against low-flying aircraft led the Soviets to bring back many guns from storage to supplement the Surface-to-Air Missiles, whose performance at low altitude was less than satisfactory.

Operational history
The S-60 and its Chinese copy (the Type 59) have seen combat in several wars all over the world – e.g., the Bajaur Campaign, Six-Day War and the Yom Kippur War in the Middle East, and the Soviet–Afghan War. The Afghan People's Army received twenty-four 57 mm guns in 1958, and deployed it during the Bajaur Campaign. During the Vietnam War, the S-60 was the keystone of North Vietnamese low-altitude air defense and was most effective between 460 meters and 1,500 meters.

In Iraq (Iran–Iraq War, Gulf War and Iraq War), the S-60, normally deployed in battalions of 36 guns, served consistently in defense of divisional headquarters and field artillery assets.

Georgian army air defence units used S-60 guns during the Russo-Georgian War. Some units engaged Russian attack aircraft near the city of Gori. None were shot down by S-60 though some were damaged.

Syrian S-60 guns were actively used during the Syrian Civil War by both the army and rebel groups. As many other guns originally designed for antiaircraft use, most of the time they were used in shelling ground targets.

The Islamic State allegedly shot down a Cessna 208 Caravan operated by the Iraqi Air Force near Hawija, Iraq on 16 March 2016 with a truck-mounted S-60.

In 2022, S-60s were used by Ukraine in the war with Russia not in their original anti-aircraft role but as indirect-fire artillery. In this role they were reported to have an effective range of 6.1km.

Ammunition types
The S-60 fires ammunition in 57×348SR caliber, with ballistics (see below) similar to the longer 57×438mm  ammunition of Bofors 57 mm AA gun, but somewhat weaker than Soviet 57 mm anti-tank guns of World War II. Modern anti-aircraft rounds have not been developed for the gun; the main characteristics of the Soviet-era ammunition are listed in the table below. In addition to these People's Republic of China manufactures ammunition in 57x348SR caliber, designated Type 59 HE-T, Type 59 AP-T, and Type 76 HE-T.

Training rounds include a blank round MK-281 ("Manöver-Kartusche", East German designation), and training rounds with -IN suffix (UBR-281U-IN, UOR-281U-IN) identifying the rounds as fuzeless versions of the APCBC and HE rounds with dummy fuzes and inert filling replacing the explosive cavities.

Airburst munitions for Russian 30 mm and 57 mm autocannons are in development.

Versions 

 AK-725: Naval version of the S-60 gun. Introduced in 1958. Mounted in single, double and quadruple mounts (designated ZIF-31) on many early Soviet destroyers.
 ZIF-72: Naval version which is enclosed in a metal housing and fully automatic. Also exported to India. Introduced in the mid-1970s.
 ZSU-57-2: Self-propelled version with two 57 mm S-60 guns (designated S-68)
 Type-80: Chinese version of the ZSU-57-2.
 S-60MB: Modernized Polish version, electrically powered, with a digital, automatic guidance system.
 BM-57: Updated version.
 AU-220M Baikal: Remote weapon station with fire control system using BM-57.

Users
The S-60 was sold to at least 37 countries during the Soviet era. The gun was also license manufactured in Poland by Zakłady Mechaniczne Tarnów in Tarnów (en. Tarnów Mechanical Works), and in Hungary by DIMÁVAG in Miskolc-Diósgyőr, and in China as the Type 59.

Current operators 
 : 70 units
 
 
 : 34 units as of 2017
 
 
 : 400 units
 
 : 600 units
 : 12 units
 
 : 15 units
 : 12 units
 : 10 units
 : 186 units (43 in store)
 
Unknown amount upgraded to use the Rapier's Blindfire radar or the AN/UPS-3 as a fire control radar. 
 
 
 : 90 units
 : 6 units
 : 2 units
 : 12 units
 
 : 144 units of Type-59 variant as of 2021
 : 500 units
 : 250 units
 
 
 
 : Both S-60 and Type 59 versions
 : 675 units                                                                                                                                                                                         
  Free Syrian Army: Used by Syrian Rebels on various trucks chassis
  People's Defense Units (YPG)
 : 22 units
 
 : 120 units

Former operators 
 : 24 units received in 1958, further 36 units delivered between 1973 and 1978.
 
 
 
 
 : 575 units. Passed on to successor states.
 : 12 units. Nicknamed Nikolai.
 
 : 21 units
 : Captured units
  People's Republic of Kampuchea
 : 24 units
 
 
 
 
 
 
 : Passed on to successor states
 
  Transnistria
 : 24 units
 : ~30 units

See also
Weapons of the Laotian Civil War
Weapons of the Lebanese Civil War

References

Bibliography

External links

 FAS page on the S-60
 Full technical characteristics 
 S-60 57mm AA Video 

Anti-aircraft guns of the Soviet Union
57 mm artillery
Military equipment introduced in the 1950s